Sing to the Dawn is a 2008 Singaporean computer-animated musical drama film. The film was produced by Infinite Frameworks, a Batam-based animation studio, Mediacorp Raintree Pictures, Media Development Authority and Scorpio East Pictures. It is loosely adapted from the short story by Minfong Ho that was first published in 1975.

The film was released on 30 October 2008 in Singapore, and later in Korea, Malaysia and Russia. It has screened at Pusan International Film Festival in South Korea and Santa Monica, USA.

A remake of the film, named Meraih Mimpi (Dream On), was released in Indonesia on 16 September 2009.

Synopsis 

Dawan is a teenage girl who lives with her brother, father and grandmother in a small village in Batam.

Pairot is an entrepreneur and cruel landlord who is visually styled after Elvis Presley. Pairot extorts the villagers with an oppressive land tax. He claims to own the entire land of the village, and tells the villagers that he has a document from King Ramelan, the former ruler of the village. The village is unaware that Pairot is planning to evict the villagers and destroy the village to build a city with hotels and casinos.

After learning about Pairot's evil plans, Dana, with the help of her sister, struggle to save her beloved village. With help from Grandfather Wiwien, Dana tries to find the King's original will. 

As a woman, Dawan's life is filled with difficulties and sadness. Dana is forced by her father to follow the village's patriarchal tradition. Her father has wanted to marry her off to Pairot's son, Benz. 

Dawan and Kai are assisted by a group of jungle animals who can talk to each other, including bird parrots named Kakatu, crow named Minah, lizards, and bear named Tante Bear.

Accompanied by their animal friends, Dawan and Kai win scholarships and thwart the landlord's plan.

Voice cast

Production 

Sing to the Dawn was produced by Infinite Frameworks (IFW), an animation studio based in Batam, Indonesia. The English-language version of the film was released on 30 October 2008 in Singapore, followed by Korea, Malaysia and Russia. The film was screened at Pusan International Film Festival in South Korea and in Santa Monica.

Production was done in Batam over three years with a budget of USD 5 million. After the English version of the film was completed in 2008, it was distributed to various countries. Sing to the Dawn was not immediately released in Indonesia because IFW wanted to introduce the film to an international audience first.

The film was an adaptation of a short story by Minfong Ho at the request of the Singapore government. The film was referred to as "the film work of the nation" by IFW, because out of the 150 animators in the studio, almost all were Indonesian except for five expatriates. The total number of expatriates involved is only 10. Many animators from Yogyakarta, London, and Solo were recruited for the production of this film. By contrast, the Singapore media wrote that the film is Singaporean because of the film initiative and funds from MediaCorp Raintree Pictures and Media Development Authority in Singapore.

Remake 
Meraih Mimpi (Dream On) is a film remake of Sing to the Dawn. It was released in Indonesia on 16 September 2009 by Kalyana Shira Films. Dream On is the second 3D animated film produced in Indonesia after Homeland (2004).

Nia Dinata was hired to assist in the localization of the film. Erwin Gutawa, the film's composer, wrote new music for the film. In addition to language, the story was overhauled.

In releasing this film, Kalyana Shira Films worked with IFW and collaborated with Mediacorp Raintree Pictures, Scorpio East Pictures, Indika Pictures and Media Development Authority from Singapore.

Film and book comparisons 

Besides changing the names of the characters, the setting moved from a small Thai village to Batam.

According to Jakarta Globe, Dream On was filled with exciting adventures and was well-suited for young children.

In the book, Pairot never dressed up like Elvis. The conflicts experienced by the villagers in the book center around women's traditional gender roles in Southeast Asia. In the film, the story centered on Pairot's plans to evict the villagers. The plot in the film has less conflict between Dana and her father who told her sister that he did not believe that women need education. This scene was not developed in the film.

In the premiere of Sing to the Dawn at Jurong Bird Park, Singapore, Minfong Ho found the movie to be very different from the book and that they are not to be compared with each other. According to Ho, the film successfully demonstrated the character and spirit of Dawan. Ho said that if she were to rate the film, she would give it 11 out of 10.

Cameo performances 

 Director Joko Anwar appeared as guest star and contributed his voice in the film as Ubay.
 Bemby Gusti is a musician who contributed the voice of Spider.

References

External links
 English
 Indonesian

2008 films
2008 3D films
Indonesian animated films
Indonesian drama films
Indonesian children's fantasy films
2000s children's fantasy films
2008 animated films